The 1971–72 season was Newport County's tenth consecutive season in the Football League Fourth Division since relegation at the end of the 1961–62 season and their 44th overall in the Football League.

Season review
County briefly wore tangerine and black striped shorts in February 1972 before fan reaction caused the club to revert to black shorts soon after.

Results summary

Results by round

Fixtures and results

Fourth Division

FA Cup

League Cup

Welsh Cup

League table

References

 Amber in the Blood: A History of Newport County.

External links
 Newport County 1971-1972 : Results
 Newport County football club match record: 1972
 Welsh Cup 1971/72

1971-72
English football clubs 1971–72 season
1971–72 in Welsh football